Ordulf (sometimes Otto) ( – 28 March 1072) was the duke of Saxony from 1059, when he succeeded his father Bernard II, until his death.  He was a member of the Billung family.

Reign
Ordulf's entire reign was occupied by wars with the Wends. He was allied with Denmark in this endeavor, and he strengthened the alliance by marrying Wulfhild of Norway, the daughter of King Olaf II of Norway, in 1042.  Their son Magnus succeeded Ordulf as Duke of Saxony.

Ordulf's second wife, Gertrude of Haldensleben, daughter of a Count Conrad, was imprisoned in Mainz in 1076 and died 21 February 1116.  Their son Bernard died after a fall from a horse in Lüneburg on 15 July of an unknown year.

Ordulf is buried in the Church of St. Michael in Lüneburg.

References

Sources

1020s births
1072 deaths
Dukes of Saxony
House of Billung
Burials at the Church of Saint Michael, Lüneburg
Year of birth uncertain